Ameen Nayfeh is a Palestinian film director and writer. He is best known for his work on the feature film 200 Meters and short filmThe Crossing.

Life and career
Nayfeh was born in Tulkarm, Palestine. He graduated with a B.Sc. in nursing from Al-Quds University and an MFA in Cinematic studies from the Red Sea Institute of Cinematic Arts. His debut feature film 200 Meters, starring Ali Suliman, about a Palestinian family separated by the Israeli wall, premiered at the Venice Film Festival in 2020.

Filmography

Awards and nominations

References

External links
 

Living people
Palestinian film directors
Palestinian writers
Al-Quds University alumni
1988 births
People from Tulkarm
Palestinian nurses
Red Sea Institute of Cinematic Arts alumni